Astronaut High School is located in Brevard County, in the city of Titusville, Florida, United States. It is part of the Brevard County School District. The school's name comes from its location, near the Kennedy Space Center. The school was built in 1972. The school's motto is "pride in  community, passion in learning". The current principal is Krista Miller.

Academics
Astronaut High School offers two academies within the school. The Health Sciences Academy offers courses for students who are interested in the medical field after graduations. Students within this academy also have the opportunity to test to become Certified Nursing Assistant (CNA). The Fine Arts Academy is an academy offered to students who are interested in the fine arts such as music and theater.  Astronaut High School also offers AVID which offers students college preparatory courses to ensure enrollment to a four-year college. The school also offers dual enrollment courses through Eastern Florida State College where students can become eligible to complete their Associate of the Arts degree at the time of graduation.

The library was recognized as one of the top ten in the state in 2010.

Athletics
Its primary sports rival is Titusville High School.

State champion teams
Girls' Basketball Champions (Class 4A) in 2006 and 2009
Boys' Track and Field State Champions 1976 (Class 3A) and 2000 (Class 2A)
Boys' Cross Country State Champions 1978, 1979 and 1980 (Class 3A)
Boys' Tennis State Champions 1990, 1992 and 1994 (Class 3A)
Wrestling State Champions 1999 (Class 4A)
Girls' Cross Country State Champions 1979, 1980, 1981, 1983, 1984 and 1985 (Class 3A)
Girls' Volleyball State Champions (Class 3A) 1980
Girls' Track and Field State Champions (Class 3A) 1979*
Girls Softball State Champions (class 3A)

Notable alumni

 Cris Collinsworth - Class of 1977; professional football player
 J.T. Hassell - Class of 2014; professional football player
Javian Hawkins - Transferred; professional football player
 Wilber Marshall - Class of 1980; professional football player
 Daniel Tosh - Class of 1993; stand-up comedian
 Aaron Walker - Class of 1998; professional football player

Notable faculty 

 Elijah Williams - former professional football player and college football coach

References

External links
Astronaut High School FOCUS Homepage
Brevard County Schools website

Brevard Public Schools
Buildings and structures in Titusville, Florida
High schools in Brevard County, Florida
Public high schools in Florida
Educational institutions established in 1972
1972 establishments in Florida